A tragic hero is the protagonist of a tragedy.

Tragic hero may also refer to:
Tragic Hero (film) directed in 1987 by Taylor Wong
"Tragic Hero" (music), a single by Funker Vogt
Tragic Hero Records, a record label